Eurytides columbus is a species of butterfly found only in Colombia (Muzo, Bogotá, Cali, Rio Calima, Rio Bravo) and northwest Ecuador (Rio Lita, Rio Llurimagua, Rio Mira).

Very nearly allied to Eurytides serville (Godart, 1824) the narrow green costal band of the forewing more oblique than in E. serville, marginal area of the forewing beneath more purplish white, the blackish lines in it and the yellowish streak on the underside of the abdominal fold of the hindwing less distinct than in E. serville; the black distal area of the hindwing sometimes touches the cell, but does not enter it. Specimens with yellowish instead of deep red anal spot are ab. fulva Oberthur. Female similar to the male. Cordillera of Bogota to the west coast of Colombia, north-west Ecuador.

Status
No known threats

Taxonomy
Possibly conspecific with E. serville.

References

Further reading
D'Abrera, B. (1981). Butterflies of the Neotropical Region. Part I. Papilionidae and Pieridae. Lansdowne Editions, Melbourne, xvi + 172 pp.
D'Almeida, R.F. (1965). Catalogo dos Papilionidae Americanos. Sociedade Brasileira de Entomologia. São Paulo, Brasil.
Rothschild, W. and Jordan, K. (1906). A revision of the American Papilios. Novitates Zoologicae 13: 411–752.online (and as pdf) (Facsimile edition ed. P.H. Arnaud, 1967).

Eurytides
Papilionidae of South America
Lepidoptera of Colombia
Lepidoptera of Ecuador
Fauna of the Amazon
Butterflies described in 1850